The Bellman (French: Sortilèges) is a 1945 French drama film directed by Christian-Jaque and starring Fernand Ledoux, Renée Faure and Madeleine Robinson. The film portrays a village haunted by superstition and fears.

Although released after the Liberation, the film was shot during the German Occupation.
The film's sets were designed by the art director Robert Gys.

The film was popular and recorded admissions in France of 2,552,165.

Cast
Fernand Ledoux as Fabret, le 'lièvre'  
Renée Faure as Catherine Fabret 
Madeleine Robinson as Marthe  
Roger Pigaut as Pierre  
Georges Tourreil as Le brigadier  
Léonce Corne as Le cordonnier  
Marcel Pérès as Le villageois  
Jacques Butin 
Léon Larive 
Pierre Labry as L'idiot du village  
Sinoël as La grand-mère  
Lucien Coëdel as Jean-Baptiste, le campanier 
Michel Piccoli as Un villageois

References

External links

1945 films
Films directed by Christian-Jaque
French drama films
1945 drama films
French black-and-white films
1940s French-language films
1940s French films